Pluto is the debut EP by Norwegian rock band Seigmen. The EP came in three editions: a black CD limited to 500 copies, a clear CD, and a red CD.

Track listing
 "Fra X Til Døden" – 6:59
 "Mono Doomen" – 3:57
 "Korstoget" – 6:21
 "Skjebnen" – 2:17
 "Syndefloden" – 5:57

Personnel
Alex Møklebust – lead vocals
Kim Ljung – bass guitar, vocals
Noralf Ronthi – drums
Marius Roth Christensen – electric guitar
Sverre Økshoff – electric guitar

1992 debut EPs
Seigmen albums